The Jensen Investment Company Building is a building located in northeast Portland, Oregon, listed on the National Register of Historic Places.

See also
 National Register of Historic Places listings in Northeast Portland, Oregon

References

External links
 

1930 establishments in Oregon
Art Deco architecture in Oregon
Commercial buildings completed in 1930
National Register of Historic Places in Portland, Oregon
Northeast Portland, Oregon
Portland Historic Landmarks